Eat (1963) is a 45-minute underground film created by Andy Warhol and featuring painter Robert Indiana, filmed on Sunday, February 2, 1964, in Indiana's studio. The film was first shown by Jonas Mekas on July 16, 1964, at the Washington Square Gallery at 530 West Broadway.

Eat is filmed in black-and-white film, has no soundtrack, and depicts fellow pop artist Indiana engaged in the process of eating for the entire length of the film. The comestible being consumed is apparently a mushroom. Finally, there is a brief appearance by a cat.

In 1964, La Monte Young provided a loud minimalist drone soundtrack to Eat when shown as small TV-sized projections at the entrance lobby to the third New York Film Festival held at Lincoln Center.

Plot
Indiana eats food.

Cast
 Robert Indiana as the eating man.

See also

 Andy Warhol filmography
 Blue Movie (1969)  – Warhol film
 Kiss (1963) – Warhol film
 List of American films of 1963
 List of American films of 1964
 Sleep (1964) – Warhol film

References

External links

Eat at WarholStars

1963 films
American black-and-white films
American silent feature films
American documentary films
Films directed by Andy Warhol
1960s English-language films
1960s American films